The following is a list of winners of the Harvey Award, sorted by category.

In 2017, the Harvey Awards decided to skip the 2017 awards ceremony and to reboot the ceremony for 2018 in order to give fewer awards by focusing on works instead of individuals.

Current awards

Main awards

Book of the Year Award

Digital Book of the Year Award

Best Children's or Young Adult Book Award

Best Adaptation From a Comic

Best Manga Title Award

Best European Book Award

Best International Book Award

Special awards

Harvey Awards Hall of Fame

International Spotlight Award

Comics Industry Pioneer Award

Previous awards

Works

Best New Series

Best Continuing or Limited Series

Best Original Graphic Publication For Younger Readers

Best Single Issue or Story

Best Graphic Album

Best Graphic Album of Original Work

Best Graphic Album of Previously Published Work

Best Anthology

Best Syndicated Strip or Panel

Best Biographical, Historical, or Journalistic Presentation

Best American Edition of Foreign Material

Best Domestic Reprint Project

Best Online Comics Work

People

Best Writer

Best Artist or Penciller

Best Cartoonist (Writer/Artist)

Best Inker

Best Letterer

Best Colorist
1988 John Higgins, for Watchmen (DC)
1989 John Higgins, for Batman: The Killing Joke (DC)
1990 Steve Oliff, for Akira (Marvel Comics)
1991 Steve Oliff, for Akira (Marvel Comics/Epic Comics)
1992 Steve Oliff, for Akira (Marvel Comics/Epic Comics)
1993 Jim Woodring, for Tantalizing Stories Presents Frank In The River (Tundra)
1994 Steve Oliff, for Spawn (Image)
1995 Steve Oliff/Olyoptics, for Spawn (Image)
1996 Chris Ware, for Acme Novelty Library (Fantagraphics Books)
1997 Chris Ware, for Acme Novelty Library (Fantagraphics Books)
1998 Chris Ware, for his body of work in 1997, including Acme Novelty Library (Fantagraphics Books)
1999 Lynn Varley, for 300 (Dark Horse Comics)
2000 Chris Ware, for Acme Novelty Library (Fantagraphics Books)
2001 Laura DePuy, for The Authority (WildStorm/DC)
2002 Chris Ware, for Acme Novelty Library (Fantagraphics Books)
2003 Dave Stewart, for Hellboy (Dark Horse Comics)
2004 Chris Ware, for Acme Novelty Datebook (Drawn & Quarterly Publishing)
2005 Dave Stewart, for DC: The New Frontier (DC)
2006 Laura Martin, for Astonishing X-Men (Marvel Comics)
2007 Lark Pien, for American Born Chinese (First Second Books)
2008 Laura Martin, for Thor (Marvel Comics)
2009 Dave Stewart, for The Umbrella Academy (Dark Horse Comics)
2010 Laura Martin, for The Rocketeer: the Complete Adventures (IDW)
2011 José Villarrubia, for Cuba: My Revolution (Vertigo/DC)
2012 Dave Stewart, for Hellboy: The Fury (Dark Horse Comics)
2013 Fiona Staples, for Saga (Image Comics)
2014 Dave Stewart, for Hellboy: The Midnight Circus (Dark Horse Comics)
2015 Dave Stewart, for Hellboy in Hell (Dark Horse Comics)
2016 Laura Allred, for Silver Surfer (Marvel Comics)

Best Cover Artist
1996 Alex Ross, for Kurt Busiek's Astro City #1 (Image)
1997 Alex Ross, for Kingdom Come #1 (DC)
1998 Alex Ross, for Kurt Busiek's Astro City (Image/Homage), Batman: Legends of the Dark Knight #100 (DC), Squadron Supreme (Marvel Comics)
1999 Alex Ross, for Kurt Busiek's Astro City (Image/Homage), Superman Forever (DC), Superman: Peace on Earth (DC)
2000 Chris Ware, for Acme Novelty Library (Fantagraphics Books)
2001 Adam Hughes, for Wonder Woman (DC)
2002 Adam Hughes, for Wonder Woman (DC)
2003 Adam Hughes, for Wonder Woman (DC)
2004 Charles Burns, for Black Hole (Fantagraphics Books)
2005 James Jean, for Fables (DC/Vertigo)
2006 James Jean, for Fables (DC/Vertigo)
2007 James Jean, for Fables (DC/Vertigo)
2008 Mike Mignola, for Hellboy (Dark Horse Comics)
2009 James Jean, for Fables (DC/Vertigo)
2010 Mike Mignola, for Hellboy: The Bride of Hell (Dark Horse Comics)
2011 Mike Mignola, for Hellboy (Dark Horse Comics)
2012 J. H. Williams, for Batwoman (DC Comics)
2013 David Aja, for Hawkeye (Marvel Comics)
2014 Fiona Staples, for Saga (Image Comics)
2015 Fiona Staples, for Saga (Image Comics)
2016 Fiona Staples, for Saga (Image Comics)

Best New Talent
1990 Jim Lee
1991 Julie Doucet
1992 Joe Quesada
1996 Adrian Tomine
1997 Jessica Abel, for Artbabe (self-published)
1998 Steven Weissman, for Yikes (Alternative Press, Inc.)
1999 Kevin Smith, for Clerks (Oni), Daredevil (Marvel Comics), Jay and Silent Bob (Oni)
2000 Craig Thompson, for Good-bye, Chunky Rice, etc.
2001 Michel Rabagliati, for Drawn & Quarterly Vol. 3, #1, Paul in the Country, etc.
2002 Jason, for Hey Wait
2003 Nick Bertozzi, for Rubber Necker
2004 Derek Kirk Kim, for Same Difference and Other Stories (Alternative Comics)
2005 Andy Runton, for Owly (Top Shelf)
2006 (tie) Roberto Aguirre-Sacasa, for Marvel Knights 4 (Marvel Comics); R. Kikuo Johnson, for Night Fisher (Fantagraphics Books)
2007 Brian Fies
2008 Vasilis Lolos, for Last Call (Oni Press)
2009 Bryan J. L. Glass, for The Mice Templar (Image Comics)
2010 Rob Guillory, for Chew (Image Comics)
2011 Chris Samnee, for Thor: The Mighty Avenger (Marvel Comics)
2012 Sara Pichelli, for Ultimate Spider-Man (Marvel Comics)

Most Promising New Talent
2013 Dennis Hopeless, for Avengers Arena (Marvel Comics)
2014 Chip Zdarsky, for Sex Criminals (Image Comics)
2015 Chad Lambert, for "Kill Me" from Dark Horse Presents (Dark Horse Comics)
2016 Tom King, for The Vision (Marvel Comics)

Special awards

Special Award for Humor
1989 Bill Watterson, for Calvin and Hobbes (Universal Press Syndicate/Andrews McMeel Publishing)
1990 Sergio Aragonés
1991 Sergio Aragonés
1992 Sergio Aragonés
1993 Sergio Aragonés
1994 Jeff Smith
1995 Sergio Aragonés
1996 Evan Dorkin
1997 Sergio Aragonés
1998 Sergio Aragonés
1999 Sergio Aragonés
2000 Sergio Aragonés, for Groo, etc.
2001 Sergio Aragonés, for Groo, etc.
2002 Evan Dorkin, for Dork (Slave Labor Graphics)
2003 Evan Dorkin, for Dork (Slave Labor Graphics)
2004 Tony Millionaire, Sock Monkey (Dark Horse Comics)
2005 Kyle Baker, for Plastic Man (DC)
2006 Kyle Baker, for Plastic Man (DC)
2007 Bryan Lee O'Malley, for Scott Pilgrim & The Infinite Sadness (Oni Press)
2008 Nicholas Gurewitch, The Perry Bible Fellowship
2009 Al Jaffee for Tall Tales (Abrams Books)
2010 Bryan Lee O'Malley, for Scott Pilgrim #5 (Oni Press)
2011 Roger Langridge, for The Muppet Show Comic Book (BOOM! Studios)
2012 Kate Beaton, for Hark! A Vagrant (harkavagrant.com; printed edition published by Drawn & Quarterly)
2013 Ryan North, for Adventure Time (KaBOOM! Studios)
2014 Ryan North, for Adventure Time (KaBOOM! Studios)
2015 Chip Zdarsky, for Sex Criminals (Image Comics)
2016 Chip Zdarsky, for Howard the Duck (Marvel Comics)

Special Award for Excellence in Presentation
1988 Watchmen, by Alan Moore and Dave Gibbons, (DC)
1989 Hardboiled Defective Stories, by Charles Burns, design by Art Spiegelman and Françoise Mouly (Raw/Pantheon)
1990 Arkham Asylum, by Grant Morrison and Dave McKean (DC)
1991 Complete Little Nemo in Slumberland, by Winsor McCay, edited by Richard Marschall, designed by Dale Crain (Fantagraphics Books)
1992 Complete Little Nemo in Slumberland, by Winsor McCay, edited by Richard Marschall, art directed by Dale Crain (Fantagraphics Books)
1993 Batman: Night Cries, by Archie Goodwin and Scott Hampton, edited by Denny O'Neil, art direction by Robbin Brosterman (DC)
1994 Marvels, by Kurt Busiek and Alex Ross; edited by Marcus McLaurin; design by Joe Kaufman and Comicraft (Marvel Comics)
1995 Acme Novelty Library, by Chris Ware; edited by Kim Thompson (Fantagraphics Books)
1996 Acme Novelty Library, by Chris Ware; edited by Kim Thompson; art directed by Chris Ware (Fantagraphics Books)
1997 Acme Novelty Library, by Chris Ware; edited by Kim Thompson, art directed by Chris Ware (Fantagraphics Books)
1998 Acme Novelty Library, by Chris Ware; edited by Kim Thompson, art directed by Chris Ware (Fantagraphics Books)
1999 Acme Novelty Library, by Chris Ware; edited by Kim Thompson, art directed by Chris Ware (Fantagraphics Books)
2000 Acme Novelty Library #13, by Chris Ware (Fantagraphics Books)
2001 Jimmy Corrigan, by Chris Ware (Pantheon)
2002 Spirit Archives designed by Amie Brockway-Metcalf (DC)
2003 Krazy and Ignatz, designed by Chris Ware (Fantagraphics Books)
2004 Acme Novelty Datebook, by Chris Ware (Drawn & Quarterly Publishing)
2005 The Complete Peanuts 1950-52, by Charles Schulz, designed by Seth (Fantagraphics Books)
2006 Little Nemo in Slumberland: So Many Splendid Sundays, by Winsor McCay (Sunday Press Books)
2007 Lost Girls, art directed by Brett Warnock and Matt Kindt (Top Shelf Productions)
2008 EC Archives, Various, edited by Russ Cochran (Gemstone Comics)
2009 Kirby: King of Comics, by Mark Evanier (Abrams Books)
2010 The Rocketeer: The Complete Adventures by Dave Stevens; edited by Scott Dunbier(IDW)
2011 Dave Stevens' Rocketeer: Artist's Edition, designed by Randall Dahlk and edited by Scott Dunbier (IDW)
2012 Walt Simonson's The Mighty Thor, Artist's Edition (IDW)
2013 Building Stories, by Chris Ware (Pantheon Books)
2014 The Best Of Comix Book: When Marvel Comics Went Underground, John Lind, Kitchen Sink Books/(Dark Horse Comics)
2015 Little Nemo: Dream Another Dream by Andrew Carl, Josh O'Neill and Chris Stevens (Locust Moon Press)
2016 Peanuts: A Tribute to Charles M. Schulz by Scott Newman (Kaboom!/Boom! Studios)

The Jack Kirby Hall of Fame
Held through 2001.
1989 Wally Wood
1990 Steve Ditko
1990 Alex Toth
1991 Jack Cole, Basil Wolverton
1992 Walt Kelly, Bernard Krigstein
1993 Jerry Siegel, Joe Shuster
1994 Bill Finger, Bob Kane
1995 Bill Everett, Stan Lee
1996 Carl Burgos, Sheldon Mayer, Julius Schwartz
1997 Retroactive: C. C. Beck, William Gaines
1997 Lifetime Achievement: Gil Kane, Joe Kubert, Carmine Infantino 
1997 International: Jean Giraud, also known as Moebius
1998 Retroactive: Reed Crandall, Gardner F. Fox
1998 Lifetime Achievement: Carmine Infantino, Murphy Anderson
1998 International: Milo Manara 
1999 Retroactive: Otto Binder, Mort Meskin 
1999 Lifetime Achievement: Neal Adams, Frank Frazetta, John Romita, Sr.
1999 International; Georges Remi, also known as Hergé
2000 No award
2001 Retroactive: Mort Weisinger
2001 Lifetime Achievement: Sheldon Moldoff
2001 International: Guido Crepax

The Hero Initiative Lifetime Achievement Award
2006 George Pérez
2006 John Romita, Sr.
2007 Joe Kubert
2011 Stan Lee
2016 Joe Giella

Sources
1988-2007 Awards: Harvey Kurtzman Awards 1988-2007, Comic Book Awards Almanac. Archived from the original on March 12, 2018.
2008 Nominations: 
2008 Awards: Millikin, Eric and staff. "Journal Datebook: August, 2008 — October, 2008", p. 25, The Comics Journal Seattle, January 2009.
2011 Nominations: 
2010 Nominations: 
2010 Awards: 
2011 Awards: 
2016 Awards: 
2018 Awards: 
2019 Awards: 
2020 Awards: 
2021 Awards: 
2022 Awards: Chiu-Tabet, Christopher (October 8, 2022). "2022 Harvey Awards Winners Announced. Multiversity Comics. Retrieved October 10, 2022.

References

Comics-related lists
Lists of award winners